Melanohalea ushuaiensis is a species of lichen in the family Parmeliaceae. It was first formally described in 1917 by Alexander Zahlbruckner as Parmelia ushuaiensis. Ted Esslinger transferred to the new genus Melanelia in 1978, which he circumscribed to contain the brown parmeliae species. In 2004, it was moved to the newly created genus Melanohalea. It is endemic to South America.

References

ushuaiensis
Lichen species
Lichens described in 1917
Lichens of South America
Taxa named by Alexander Zahlbruckner